Marta is a Brazilian footballer who represents Brazil women's national football team as a forward. As of 19 February 2022, she has played for the senior national team in 171 matches. With 115 goals, she is the all-time top scorer of Brazil. She is also ninth in all-time top scorers of women's international football.

International goals

Statistics

Goals by year

Goals by competition

Goals by opponent

See also
 List of women's footballers with 100 or more international goals

References

Marta
Women's association football records and statistics
Marta goals
Marta goals